Huang Jing (黄敬; 1912–1958) was a Chinese communist revolutionary and politician.

Huang Jing may also refer to:

Huang Jing (academic) (黄靖; born 1956), Chinese-American political scientist
Huang Jing (basketball) (黄靖, born 1985), Chinese basketball player